John Avila is an American bassist and music producer, best known for being in the new wave band Oingo Boingo from 1984 to 1995.

Career
Avila co-founded the music group Food for Feet  in 1981, and played with them until 1991.

In 1984, he joined Oingo Boingo, replacing bassist Kerry Hatch. He played with Boingo until 1995. Avila has worked with many other musical acts including Psychotic Aztecs and Neville Staple in his backing band "The Hitmen". Avila owns and operates the recording studio, Brando's Paradise. He is currently the bass player in the Los Angeles-based multi-media group the Mutaytor  and The Gama Sennin.

References

External links

Year of birth missing (living people)
Living people
People from San Gabriel, California
20th-century American bass guitarists
20th-century American male musicians
21st-century American bass guitarists
21st-century American male musicians
American rock bass guitarists
Record producers from California
Hispanic and Latino American musicians
American musicians of Mexican descent
Keytarists
American male bass guitarists